Darkover is the planet that gives its name to the Darkover series of science fiction-fantasy novels and short stories by Marion Zimmer Bradley and others published since 1958. According to the novels, Darkover is the only habitable planet of seven orbiting a fictional red giant star called Cottman.

The Cottman stellar system
Bradley describes Cottman's Star as a red giant, around which seven planets orbit. Among these, CottmanIV, known to its inhabitants as Darkover, is the only habitable planet. The three inner planets and two outer planets are not habitable. CottmanV is an ice planet that while not toxic to humans, cannot naturally support a self-sustaining human population.

Like Cottman V, Darkover is a planet stuck in a permanent ice age. Only one small equatorial strip of its single smallish continent is warm enough to support limited agriculture, fishing, and livestock. Similar in size to Earth, Darkover has a lower gravity due to its relative lack of metals; it also has a higher percentage of oxygen in the atmosphere. The planet's period of rotation is 28 hours (Star of Danger, Chapter 2). One Darkover year is roughly equal to fifteen Earth months.

Darkover weather and geography
Darkover's weather is affected by two major forces:
 A huge mountain range called "The Wall Around the World" reaches a height of 9,000 meters above sea level. This mountain range has the cooling effect of a third pole and has set the angle of Darkover's axis of rotation to be more extreme than that of Earth's which causes an extreme fluctuation between summer and winter temperatures in its equatorial region.
 Unlike Earth, which has only one natural satellite, Darkover has four moons, each a different color, which affect tidal forces and weather patterns. These are Liriel, Kyrrdis, Idriel, and Mormallor. It is thought that Mormallor may have been a passing asteroid that was captured by Darkover's gravity.

The planet is dominated by polar icecaps and glaciers that cover most of its surface. The habitable area, just a few degrees north of the equator, joins the northern polar icecap on its northern and eastern side. Glaciers and impassible mountains (The Wall Around the World) prevent travel outside of the habitable lands. Darkover's nominally temperate continental zone, which borders the open water of the planet's ocean, is nevertheless subject to severe winter weather, and a warm day in summer is rare.

The temperate portion of the continent is dominated by evergreen forests that grow in the mountain foothills. These trees contain a flammable resin which contributes to frequent forest fires during the warmer months. Further, southwest from the forests are Darkover's highlands, plains, salt marshes and arable river valleys. On the continent's far western side is another mountain range called "The Hellers" and a high elevation cold desert plateau called "The Dry Towns".

Multiple conflicting attempts have been made at producing a map of Darkover. There was a map in The Heritage of Hastur (1975) that Bradley repudiated in a fan newsletter in 1978, saying, "The map in HH was fortunately inaccurate enough to be ignored". In any event, it does not match the Speakman map that illustrates this article. Thorsten Renk's attempt at mapping Darkover based on the descriptions of journeys provided in several of the books (starting with Darkover Landfall and ending with The Heritage of Hastur) produced a third map that does not match the others. Renk is probably correct when he says that Bradley appears to have a mental model when she writes, but not a map in the ordinary sense.

Some cities or locations on the map are associated with the seven Domains: Hastur with the Hasturs; Armida with the Altons; Ardais with the Ardais; Serrais with the Ridenow; and Aldaran with the Aldarans. In Traitor's Sun, Chapter 3, the Domain of Elhalyn is described as stretching "from the west side of the Lake of Hali to the Sea of Dalereuth"; this is not on the map, nor is the Aillard Domain. Other names on the map are Towers: Hali, where the Tower was destroyed, but its burnt rubble and a small chapel, the Rhu Fead, remain; Arilinn; Dalereuth; and Neskaya. Thendara is the location of the Comyn Castle and its Tower, which was destroyed in Exile's Song, as well as the main Terran spaceport and administrative offices. Another Terran spaceport is at Caer Donn. Nevarsin is a retreat and a center of learning administered by the monks of St. Valentine of the Snows, a monastery founded by Father Valentine following a tragic event in Darkover Landfall. Storn is a castle (located on Storn Heights) and the Storn family was important in Stormqueen! and The Winds of Darkover. Shainsa is the chief of the Dry Towns and figures significantly in The Shattered Chain. The name Neskaya is derived from "New Skye", the first settlement, near the place where the original colonizing ship crashed.

Geology
Darkover is poor in metals. Gold and silver are known but not in any quantity, and the most valuable metal is copper. Wealthy women have "butterfly clasps" for their hair made of copper; poorer women must make do with something fashioned of leather and wood. Iron is more common, but very valuable because it is used for swords and horseshoes. In City of Sorcery, Chapter 1, a man locks up his market stall, and the yet unnamed narrator, a Terran woman in Darkovan clothing, thinks he is prosperous, because "he can afford a Terran metal lock". Since some men carry swords, and most men and many women carry knives, presumably made of iron, this seems to be somewhat contradictory. Perhaps it is the Terran craftsmanship and technology, not the metal, that makes the lock valuable.

In The Bloody Sun, Chapter 9, the matrix workers at Ariliin agree to do a geological survey using their powers, to forestall a survey that otherwise would be done by the Terrans. They are to search for "tin, copper, silver, iron, tungsten" and for "fuels, for sulfur, hydrocarbons, chemicals". The purpose is to prevent Terrans and their "infernal machines" from spreading across Darkover. They succeed in locating mineral deposits and marking them on maps (ironically, maps created using the assistance of Terran surveys), but the effort, at first successful, is abandoned.

The most important mineral on Darkover is the matrix stone or starstone, a jewel that the first colonists discover in Darkover Landfall. It has a deep blue color, and large ones are rare. Its composition is not known by anyone, and in fact it is theorized by some that it is a form of life. This jewel provides a focus and a way to magnify laran.

Native sapient Darkover species
Bradley's fictional world is populated with an intelligent species, the Chieri, already ancient and in decline when the human colonists arrive. As the series developed, she introduced three other sapient native species—the Trailmen, Forge-Folk, and Catmen—as well as two genetically engineered sapient species—the Cralmac and Kyrri. One additional species is also frequently mentioned, the Ya-men, but Bradley leaves ambiguous the question of whether these creatures are sapient or not.

Catmen
The Catmen are the primary antagonists in The Spell Sword and feature in a number of the short stories. In The Spell Sword, Bradley describes them as carrying short, curved swords, capable of coordinating attacks against the humans, and able to use laran and starstones. The Catmen also featured prominently in several of the short stories, including David Heydt's I'm a Big Cat Now from Towers of Darkover; Linda Frankel and Paula Crunk's Blood Hunt from The Other Side of the Mirror; and Judith Sampson's To Serve Kihar from Domains of Darkover.

Chieri
The Chieri are a race of six-fingered, tall, telepathic humanoids who have no permanent gender. Extremely long-lived, with life-spans reaching into the tens of thousands of years, they are described as gray or golden-eyed and with long, silvery-white hair. They will change sexes as the situation warrants for mating purposes. The World Wreckers describes the Chieri as the last, dying remnants of a space-traveling people whose abilities have dwindled with their fertility and ambition.

Chieri and humans are similar biologically and are able to interbreed. These hybrids exhibit some of the Chieri characteristics of coloring and physiology. They also have psychic gifts, and their descendants become the Comyn. In Star of Danger, the Chieri who aids Kennard Alton and Larry Montray, tells them that the Chieri share common ancestors with the Trailmen and the Kyrri, though not with the Terrans.

The Chieri feature prominently in The World Wreckers, The Planet Savers, Star of Danger, and in the long-lived, half-human/half-Chieri characters, Robert Kadarin and Thyra Scott, who appear in The Heritage of Hastur and Sharra's Exile.

Cralmac
The Cralmac are semi-intelligent beings, artificially bred by humans during the Ages of Chaos, from Trailmen altered with human DNA. They usually feature in the Darkovan novels as the servants of laranzu'in working in the towers, with the explanation that theirs is the only touch humans in the hyper-sensitive state of the matrix worker can bear.

The Cralmac feature prominently in Patricia B. Cirone's Victory's Cost from Towers of Darkover.

Forge-Folk
The Forge-Folk are not particularly well defined, though they are described as about the same height and build as the Trailmen. Walter Breen's The Darkover Concordance describes them as a cross between humans and non-humans, who speak an ancient variant of the Hellers dialect. They are Darkover's primary miners and metalworkers. The Forge Folk worship the Sharra matrix, and appear to be the only creatures on Darkover capable of handling Sharra without causing catastrophe.

The Forge-Folk feature prominently in the conclusion of The Winds of Darkover, and are mentioned in several of the Sharra stories.

Kyrri
The Kyrri are humanoid bipeds with grey or silver fur, simian faces and glowing green (or dark) eyes. Perhaps they are the result of genetic engineering during the Ages of Chaos, or they may be a native species from the pre-history of Darkover. In Sharra's Exile, Book Two, Chapter 5, Regis Hastur speculates that even tower workers do not know the origins of the Kyrri.

Kyrri generate a bioelectric field and sometimes give painful but non-lethal electric shocks when excited or threatened. The Kyrri appear in The Bloody Sun, Star of Danger, and The Sword of Aldones, and also in Sharra's Exile, the replacement for the latter book. They are used primarily as servants in the Towers because they can pass through the barriers that non-telepathic humans cannot. In The Bloody Sun, one is a servant in the Alton townhouse in Thendara. Although the Kyrri can understand human speech, they do not speak themselves, and in Sharra's Exile Regis Hastur wonders how the message he gave one would be delivered.

Trailmen
The Trailmen are described as social herbivores who dwell in arboreal communities and live in extended family clans. Unattached females form bands of ronin who wander the forests attacking travelers. These Trailmen-human cause the cross-species transmission of a 48-year cyclic illness known as Trailmen's Fever, which is mild in Trailmen and often fatal in humans. The Chieri call the Trailmen a word that means "The Little Brothers Who Are Not Wise".

The Trailmen feature prominently in the novels, The Planet Savers and Star of Danger, and in Diana L. Paxson's short story, The Place Between, from Snows of Darkover.

Ya-men
The Ya-men are a mountain-dwelling bird-like race, of questionable intelligence, who are susceptible to the effects of "ghost winds".
Though they are mentioned as a background element in many of the books, the Ya-men are a critical plot element in Two to Conquer, The Winds of Darkover, and Cynthia McQuillin's The Forest from The Keeper's Price.

In A Darkover Retrospective, Bradley says, "...I have no idea what the Ya-Men were — or are — like. I only know that they are very terrible indeed, with plumes and talons and shrill yelping cries..." This is a conscious decision; she thinks that monsters should not be described in too much detail, lest they lose their horror.

Humans

The Comyn
Comyn is the term used for aristocratic members of Darkover society who are gifted with the psychic abilities commonly called laran. Comyn women may be referred to as Comynara, especially by commoners.

The Comyn are the surviving laran-gifted families of Darkover who are ruling at the time of recontact with the Terran Empire. It is suggested in Darkover Landfall that they are the descendants of human-chieri pairings, who have learned to use native matrix stones to focus their laran powers. The Comyn, however, have their own mythology, recited in the Ballad of Hastur and Cassilda: they are the descendants of Hastur, son of Aldones, Lord of Light, who fell to earth, fell in love with Cassilda, and (perhaps) became mortal. Cassilda bore Hastur seven sons who founded the seven Domains.

Each Comyn family controls part of Darkover's landmass, known as a Domain, but strategic inter-marriage and feudal land issues result in fluctuating domain borders. Each Comyn family has a gift — a family-specific laran power, though in reality, not every member of the family has the family gift. Also, a member of a family may have another family's gift, in whole or in part. The gifts may skip generations. Of particular note is that twins often have differing amounts of the family gifts. One twin usually has more of the gifts than does the other twin.

Walter Breen cites Christopher Gibson for the observation that comyn is derived from the Gaelic word, comhionnan, meaning equal, and appears to refer to the communal origins of Darkover.

A Comyn family frequently fosters a child from another Comyn family, at least for a few years. This results in a Comyn adult having "foster-brothers" and "foster-sisters".  One example of this is Regis Hastur and Lew Alton. Regis lived at Armida during part of his childhood.

The Comyn families are:

Hastur of Hastur
 Gift: Living matrix
 Device: A silver tree on a blue background
 Colors: Blue and silver
 Other names associated with this domain: Di Asturien, Syrtis

Hastur of Elhalyn
 Gift: Ability to see all possible outcomes from every decision or choice. This gift can be very useful if it can be controlled. It awakens in Regis Hastur in The Planet Savers and he nearly goes mad.
 Device: A crowned silver tree on a blue background
 Colors: Blue and silver
 The old line of Elhalyn died out, and the Hastur domain divided to re-establish it (The Forbidden Tower, Chapter 18).

Alton
 Gift: Ability to force rapport; "command voice" to force a person to obey
 Device: An eagle perched upon a tor
 Colors: Green and black
 Other names associated with this domain: Castamir, Lanart, Leynier

Ardais 
 Gift: Catalyst telepathy (awakens laran that is latent in a person, who may not realize that he has it)
 Device: A hawk (The Forbidden Tower, Chapter 18).
 Colors: Black and silver
 Pronunciation: In Thendara House, Jaelle says the name is pronounced are-dayze (pg 96)

Aillard
 Gift: Never mentioned in any of Bradley's novels and short stories, except that it manifests only in women. In the Clingfire trilogy, it is mentioned that Aillard males capitalized on their recessive Aillard Gift, making them better Keepers in a working circle of telepaths. According to The Darkover Concordance, the Aillard gift is extinct.
 Device: Red and grey feathers (The Forbidden Tower, Chapter 18).
 Colors: Red and grey
 Other names associated with this domain: Lindir
 The leadership or rule of this domain runs in the female line.
 Pronunciation: Ale-lard, with a long "A" in the first syllable and the accent on the second.

Aldaran
 Gift: Ability to see into the future, sometimes to see multiple future possibilities; weather forecasting and ability to change the weather or control winds.
 Device: A two-headed eagle
 Colors: Red and black
 Other names associated with this domain: Darriell, Delleray, Hammerfell, MacAran, Rockraven, Scathfell, Storn
 Notable for: Aldaran is not a formal member of the Comyn Council, because they never ratified the Compact, and were the first domain to interact with the Terrans. In the early Ages of Chaos, Aldaran was responsible for The Cataclysm, the destruction of the original Hali tower using a laran weapon that created the heavier-than-air, cloud-filled, Hali Lake.

Ridenow of Serrais
 Gift: Empathy and the ability to sense and communicate with non-human intelligences
 Colors: Green and gold
 Notable for: During the Ages of Chaos, Serrais was overrun by a Dry Town clan, the Ridenow, who intermarried with the Serrais women (probably against their will). This rejuvenated the strain, and allowed the Serrais gift to survive in the Ridenow bloodline.

Commoners
Commoners are the population of Darkover that are not members of a Comyn clan or family. In general, they are portrayed as less educated than the Comyn, hard-working, shrewd and honorable, although some are members of bandit gangs. Some of them are fairly wealthy, owning lands and raising crops or animals, or having successful businesses, such as tailoring and dressmaking, leatherworking and other crafts, milling and cheesemaking, or inn-keeping. They form their own councils and petition the Comyn for changes in policy or for assistance.

In The Bloody Sun, Chapter 9, a group of Darkovans calling themselves the Pan-Darkovan Syndicate meets with Danvan Hastur and the members of the Arilinn Tower, and raises objections to the decision of the Comyn to limit trade and imports from the Terran Empire. Their spokesperson, Valdrin of Carthon, says they want some of the advantages that come with being a part of the Empire. Hastur states that the decision of the Comyn was to preserve the Darkovan way of life and not become another satellite state of the Empire. Valdrin counters that Terran technology needs to be adopted since Darkover's matrix technology has been declining and Terran technology can replace it, or Darkover might sink into another Age of Chaos. This is a major plot point, as Arilinn Tower then engages to do a mining survey faster and better than the Terrans.

The Renunciates
In the introduction to Free Amazons of Darkover, Bradley wrote that her Renunciates have become "the most attractive and controversial of my creations". The Guild of Oath-Bound Renunciates, called Free Amazons and com'hi letzii in earlier books, are women who have opted out of Darkover's traditional gender-based roles, including marriage, obligations to clan, and the expectation of male protection. In later books, "Free Amazons" is considered to be a misnomer and insulting or opprobrious, but the Renunciates themselves are tolerant of those who use "Free Amazons" out of ignorance.

The origins of this guild during the Hundred Kingdoms era are described in Two to Conquer as the merger between the Sisterhood of the Sword, a military-mercenary guild, and the Priestesses of Avarra, a cloistered order that offered medical and other care to women, primarily abused women. Towards the end of Two to Conquer, Carlina di Asturien comes to believe that the two guilds need to work together for the benefit of all women on Darkover. Bradley acknowledged a Patricia Matthews fan story as the origin of the Sisterhood of the Sword, and described the Priesthood of Avarra as a counterforce.

Bradley noted that most of the fan fiction she received was inspired by the Renunciates, and that she had met individuals who had taken Renunciate-style names or were attempting to live in women's communes inspired by the Renunciate guildhouses.

A Renunciate takes an oath, and thereafter is known only by her first name and the name of her mother, with the connecting word "n'ha", meaning "daughter of". The woman who administers the oath is called her "oath-mother". Magdalene Lorne takes the name Margali n'ha Ysabet: Margali is a Darkovan version of her Terran name, Magdalene (she is also called Magda), and her mother's name was Elizabeth. Camilla, born Elorie Lindir, takes the name Camilla n'ha Kyria, because her mother was Kyria Aillard. Had she been legitimate or acknowledged as nedestro, her name might have been Elorie Hastur.

Laran
Laran is the Darkovan word for telepathic talent and the talents associated with it: telekinesis, precognition, a "sixth sense", empathy, teleportation, and others. It is the distinguishing feature of the people of Darkover. Although it appears mostly in Comyn, others may have it. It appears mostly in people who have red hair, and generally manifests itself at the time of puberty. Elorie Ardais, in The Bloody Sun, Chapter 7, says, "Everyone alive has some small degree of laran". Damon Ridenow, in The Spell Sword, Chapter 6, reflects on the odd fact that Andrew Carr, a Terran, has laran, and can telepathically be in touch with Callista when he and Callista's twin sister cannot:
In the telepath caste, it was often the accident of possessing laran, the specific telepath Gift, which determined how close a relationship would come. Caste, family, social position, all these became irrelevant compared to that one compelling fact; one had, or one did not, that inborn power, and in consequence one was stranger or kinfolk. By that criterion alone, the most important one on Darkover, Andrew Carr was one of them, and the fact that he was an Earthman was a small random fact without any real importance.

Being telepathically connected to another is called being "in rapport".

Elizabeth Mackintosh, a character in the novel Rediscovery, suggests the Darkovan language appears to be derived from old Terran languages. She proposes a genetic basis for the development of laran on Darkover, noting that the original population of the colony derived overwhelmingly from north-west Europe (the Scottish highlands, Ireland and the Basque country) where a belief in supernatural abilities such as the second sight is common, and red hair is common as well.

Matrix stones
A matrix jewel or "starstone" provides a focus and a way to magnify laran. In Darkover Landfall, a chieri gives one to his human lover so she can call on him if necessary. A matrix stone can be attuned to one person, who will always carry it with him and cannot lose it because he always knows where it is. If it is forcibly removed from him, he may go into shock and die. As related in The Bloody Sun, a small matrix stone can be attuned to a person and used as a lock on a box, and only the person to whom the matrix stone is attuned will be able to open the box.

Most persons with laran have a matrix stone that they carry in a small bag or pouch made of silk or leather, which are "insulators". Usually, the pouch is worn around the neck as a pendant.

In general, the larger the stone, the more it can amplify the user's laran. Matrix stones can be used to power aircraft or make a person invisible (The Bloody Sun). Trained matrix mechanics can create a "screen" by placing several jewels within glass in a pattern that they determine on an ad hoc basis, depending on the purpose of the screen. This can magnify telepathic powers even more. A screen cannot be managed by a single matrix user. The geological survey conducted The Bloody Sun is accomplished by making and using such a screen; in Sharra's Exile and Two To Conquer, a screen is used to teleport a person from another star system.

In Sharra's Exile, Book Two, Chapter 8, the Keeper Ashara explains that matrix mechanics, that is, the scientific use of laran amplified by matrix stones, is the first of the non-causal sciences.

Towers
The Towers are the centers of the use of laran and schools for those who are learning to use their laran. A designated person is always on duty ("in the relays") to exchange news and requests for help telepathically with other Towers. At least once, the Terrans wonder how news travels so fast on Darkover. Towers are, in theory, independent of any caste discrimination or political influence. Each Tower should have a Keeper, a person to direct both Tower policy and the power of the laran users when they gather together in rapport to work. The Keeper of Arilinn is considered the second most-powerful person on Darkover, after the Hastur regent.

One who goes to a Tower for training advances through degrees of competence: first Monitor, then levels of Mechanic. Each degree requires an oath to do no harm and not abuse laran. First, a trainee learns to set up "barriers" to keep his thoughts from being read against his will, and to keep from "broadcasting" his thoughts and feelings. The next stage of training involves learning how to read one's own physiological symptoms such as heartbeat, respiration and body temperature, and (with permission) to read those of others. Once the trainee is proficient at this, he is qualified to "monitor" other laran workers to ensure that they are not in danger when working, and takes the Monitor's Oath, with the approval of the members of the Tower. A person who is deemed morally or otherwise unfit to work with laran will not be allowed to take the oath and will be expelled from the tower without any more training. This apparently happened to Dyan Ardais.

A matrix Mechanic learns to manipulate matter and energy using his laran and matrix stone, and to make and use tools that focus and augment laran. In The Bloody Sun Jeff Kerwin, just beginning his training as a mechanic, notices that the hinge on a door is beginning to rust, and, taking out his matrix, he stops it. Greater skill is required to perform tasks such as refining metals or causing rain to fight a forest fire. Despite all the things that can be done with laran, it is not wise to use it for everything; in The Bloody Sun Rannirl, a Level 2 Mechanic, repairs a leaky roof at Arilinn by climbing onto the roof with materials and tools.

The highest degree is Keeper, but generally women are trained for this arduous position from a young age. Not many young women want to undergo this. A Keeper is the center of a group of laran workers, who accepts the energy ("energons") that they generate and directs it.

There are several Towers. In World Wreckers it is mentioned that there are nine Towers, but only seven Towers are ever named: Arilinn, Comyn Tower, Corandolis, Dalereuth, Hali, Neskaya, and Tramontana. Most of the named towers can be located. Arilinn tower is close to Arilinn town in the Plains of Arilinn across the Venza Hills from Thendara. Comyn tower is in Thendara. Dalereuth Tower is far south at the coast. Hali Tower was north of Thendara at the shore of Lake Hali. Neskaya Tower is in the south-eastern foothills of the Kilghard Hills. Tramontana tower is in the Hellers, about a day or more west of Aldaran. Journeys to Neskaya and Arilinn are described and they appear on the map.

Only the location of Corandolis is never revealed. As the location of the other Towers are known and can be connected with a certain Domain, an educated guess about the location of Corandolis can be made; Elhalyn had Hali right at the lakeshore, Neskaya is less than a day from both Serrais and Armida, Tramontana is close to Caer Donn, Dalereuth is close to Valeron and thus serves Aillard, and both the Comyn Tower and Arilinn would be accessible from the various points of the Hastur Domain. This leaves Ardais alone without access to a Tower, thus it is possible that Corandolis Tower is in the Hellers somewhere beyond Scaravel about a day from Ardais. The location of the remaining two unnamed Towers is unknown.

The importance of the Towers diminished after the Ages of Chaos and by the time the Terrans arrive, there were not enough trained telepaths for all of them to function, and in addition some of the independent Towers did not have a Keeper. Hali Tower was destroyed during the Ages of Chaos. So was Neskaya, but it was rebuilt. Comyn Tower, attached to Comyn Castle in Thendara, was for centuries the home of the Keeper Ashara.

In The Spell Sword, Chapter 7, Damon Ridenow realizes that to supervise two untrained telepaths, Andrew Carr and Ellamir Lanart-Alton, he must function as a Keeper. For many years, perhaps not since Varzil the Good, men have not been Keepers. Damon's realization leads to the formation of The Forbidden Tower and eventually, a civil war among the Comyn.

Afterwards, as related in The Bloody Sun, there are independent matrix workers, not attached to a Tower or a Domain. They perform various services, such as making the matrix locks described above. However, when Jeff Kerwin, possessing his mother's matrix, queries a pair of independent matrix workers about it, they refuse to tell him anything.

Threshold sickness
Some of the Comyn, as they enter puberty and their laran begins to awaken, have a bad reaction called "threshold sickness". Symptoms are headache, disorientation, nausea, fever and a lack of desire for food. This is sometimes blamed on the breeding programs that fixed the laran Gifts in the Comyn families during the Ages of Chaos. In a severe case, the person may die. More frequently, the afflicted young man or woman must be confined and treated by an experienced laran worker until he or she recovers. Some Comyn have only a slight case of threshold sickness. Others, for example, Cleindori, have had telepathic abilities since they were children and are unaffected.

The Overworld
The Overworld is a laran representation of the real world. A person with laran, especially when using a matrix, can travel at great speeds in the Overworld and communicate as if face-to-face with others who are there. In The Spell Sword, Damon Ridenow searches for Callista Leynier, who is missing, in the Overworld, and encounters a part of the Overworld that is blocked off by a powerful laran presence. It seems likely that Callista is within the inaccessible area. In Exile's Song Marguerida Alton destroys the representation of Comyn Tower in the Overworld that Ashara has maintained for hundreds of years to stay alive. Later she learns that she has destroyed the real Comyn Tower, part of Comyn Castle, as well.

In the Overworld, one may see sleepers dreaming or people wandering aimlessly and lost. When Cleindori (Dorilys Aillard) is a child, she joins a matrix circle of her relatives in the Overworld, and after they tell her that she is too young to be doing that, they ask, "How did you get here?" She replies that she has always been able to get here, and that she used to visit her baby sister here before she was born. The Overworld is where people, at least some people, go after death. In Exile's Song, Chapter 22, Marguerida Alton visits the Overworld again, and meets her mentor in musical studies, Ivor Davidson, who is deceased. He is listening to "the music of the spheres".

In The Forbidden Tower, Damon Ridenow explores "levels" of the Overworld, going back in time to try to discover lost secrets. He calls this "Timesearch". He encounters Varzil the Good from the distant past, who greets him as a kinsman (they are both Ridenow) and warns him that what he is attempting is dangerous.

Cherilly's Law
This is the first law of matrix mechanics, mentioned in Sharra's Exile, Book Two, Chapter 8, and elsewhere. It states that everything in the universe has one and only one exact duplicate, somewhere in space and time, except a matrix stone. Only matrix stones are each wholly unique, and any attempt to duplicate a matrix will destroy it and the attempted duplicate.

Matrix weapons
In the Ages of Chaos and the Hundred Kingdoms, matrix workers, using screens to amplify their powers, devised powerful weapons of war. In The Forbidden Tower, Chapter 6, they are described as "-- fire-forms, and wind-creatures to tear down castles and whole walls, and creatures from other dimensions walking abroad in the land -- ". Other matrix workers defended against these weapons. The Compact banned matrix weapons.

Clingfire
Clingfire is a liquid made by matrix workers that when set afire, keeps burning as long as there is some substance to burn. Clingfire will even burn stone. Evidently it is slowly exhausted or used up as it burns, because it does not simply burn all the way to the center of the planet. Arrows may be dipped in clingfire, ignited and shot, or containers of burning clingfire may be dropped from "aircars" (matrix-powered aerial vehicles). An attack of this nature by many aircars on Aldaran Castle in Stormqueen! was frustrated by Dorilys Aldaran, the titular stormqueen, who blasts them from the sky with lightning.

A huge clingfire attack destroyed the Hali Tower, which led to the adoption of the Compact, which forbids the use of matrix weapons.

Bonewater dust
Bonewater dust is a substance, possibly radioactive, that is used to render a place uninhabitable for years. It is used against places that are especially hated or to deliver a dose of slow poison to an entire army.

The Spell Sword
In the novel The Spell Sword Damon Ridenow sets a small matrix stone into the hilt of a sword. He realizes that by doing so he may, in theory, be violating The Compact, and that such matrix weapons are banned. He discovers that although he is no use in actual battle, being a poor swordsman, he can use the sword as a weapon in the Overworld, and thereby assist the soldiers "on the ground". Other swords, with larger matrices, are important weapons that figure in the novels.

The Sword of Aldones
In Sharra's Exile the Sword of Aldones is called the weapon against Sharra. It is kept in the rhu fead, a small chapel near the site of the destroyed Tower of Hali, and near the place where the Comyn have funerals and inter their own kind. The rhu fead is protected by a barrier that cannot be passed except by Comyn, but the sword itself is behind a barrier that no Comyn can pass. In Sharra's Exile, Lew Alton, with the help of Ashara and a few others, solves this puzzle. Lew is severely wounded by an attack after the sword is recovered, and is about to die when Regis Hastur arrives, more or less by chance, claims the sword and uses it to heal Lew, to the astonishment of the attending doctors. Lew then asks Regis who he is, and Regis says, "Hastur". Hastur was the legendary son of Aldones.

The Sword of Hastur
This sword is said to be kept in Hastur Castle. It will slay anyone who draws it except in defense of the Hastur Domain.

Sharra
Sharra is an ancient matrix weapon. In the Winds of Darkover it is simply a large matrix stone, about the size of a child's hand. In The Heritage of Hastur it has been set into the hilt of a sword. Sharra is also called the "Form of Fire." She is worshiped by the Forge-Folk.

Bradley provides multiple explanations for Sharra. In The Sword of Aldones, Sharra is described as a powerful matrix in which an Alton leronis had become trapped eons ago. However, in the rewrite of that book, Sharra's Exile, Bradley describes Sharra as a portal to another dimension, though which a powerful alien energy is able to gain a foothold on Darkover. Breen describes Sharra as an anthropomorphized matrix weapon, left over from the Ages of Chaos. Desideria Leynier, in The Winds of Darkover, uses the Sharra matrix against a group of bandits who have taken over Storn Heights. In The Heritage of Hastur, Marjorie Scott and Lew Alton, drugged and under the influence of Kadarin and Beltran Aldaran, raise the Form of Fire and destroy the Terran spaceport of Caer Donn. The Terrans then finally realize the meaning of the Compact, and its necessity.

In The Winds of Darkover, Dan Barron, a Terran, has visions of Storn Heights, brought to him by a laran rapport with Brynat Storn. In Chapter 1, he sees Sharra:
In the midst of the flame there was a woman.... She was almost inhumanly tall and slender, but girlish; she stood bathed in the flame as if standing carelessly under a waterfall... She looked merry and smiling.... And then the girlish, merry face wavered and became supernally beautiful with the beauty of a great goddess burning endlessly in the fire, a kneeling woman bound in golden chains....
Later:
[T]he figure changed, grew, and was, again, the great chained Being, regal, burning, searing her beauty into his heart and brain.

The ancient Keeper of Comyn Tower, Ashara, tries to explain Sharra to Lew Alton, who is, one might say, "possessed" by the Form of Fire after the events in The Heritage of Hastur. Ashara hints that Sharra is actually an extra-dimensional being and the Sharra matrix is used to summon her. She also hints at the reason the matrix was set into a sword:
"What do you think would happen to a person who was killed with such a sword?"

Culture
Darkovan culture in the Domains is essentially feudal: the Comyn are the nobility and there is a king of Elhalyn lineage. Rarely, an Elhalyn is crowned king and rules, but usually the actual rule of the Domains is entrusted to the Hasturs, since the Elhalyns are considered "unstable". Thus there is a Hastur regent and the ranking male of the Elhalyn domain is given respect but no real power. The seven Domains have lesser family names associated with them, as noted above. All other persons are "commoners" and even if they have laran they probably have no chance of social advancement, although they may obtain tower training and earn respect.

Language
There are two important languages on Darkover: Cahuenga, spoken generally by everyone, and Casta, usually only spoken by the nobility. There are mountain, lowland and regional accents and dialects. Sometimes Bradley attempts to reproduce a dialect with English contractions and spelling. For instance, in Hawkmistress!, Part 3, Chapter 5, Romilly, the protagonist, realizes "with horror" that her mountain accent has crept into her speech when she says, "...I'm nae servant to the lady; if ye' want her fetched and carried for, me lord, ye' can even do it yerself".

There are, in all, nine different languages on Darkover.

Although Darkover is a richly realized and detailed world, the two languages are rarely distinguished in the books. They derive, ultimately, from the two languages spoken by the colonists, as described in Darkover Landfall: Celtic, spoken by the communal colonists, becomes Cahuenga, and Spanish, spoken by the officers and crew of the crashed ship, becomes Casta. The two tongues blend and borrow words from each other. Bradley was not as talented a linguist as Tolkien was, with the ability to invent entire languages and explain their imaginary origins, but the basic vocabulary is quite consistent throughout the books.

For much more information about the languages of Darkover, including a discussion of grammar, examples of translation and lists of words, there is the essay by Thorsten Renk.

Laws and traditions

The Compact
The Compact forbids any weapon that does not bring its user within reach of the person it is used against. Its intention is to forbid laran weapons, which caused much destruction and loss of life in the Ages of Chaos. The Compact is perhaps the most distinctive and important part of Darkovan society. It was conceived by Varzil the Good and adopted by all the Comyn, except the Aldarans. It ended the Ages of Chaos and the Hundred Kingdoms and brought peace. Because the Aldaran Domain never adopted it, they were excluded from the Comyn Council. The Compact also forbids guns, "blasters" and other Terran weapons, which is a plot point in several books. Swords and knives are the weapons allowed by the Compact. Even a bow and arrow is prohibited, although they can be used for hunting.

Knife exchange ritual
In The Winds of Darkover, Chapter 3, Lerrys, the foster-son of Valdir, Lord Alton, realizes that Dan Barron has some sort of telepathic ability and that he will have "troubles" on their journey into the mountains, since he has visions of Sharra. Dan has no knife, and Lerrys explains:
"By custom and law here -- a knife or any other weapon must never be lent or given, except between sworn friends or kinfolk. To say 'my knife is yours' is a pledge. It means you will defend the other..."
Lerrys then gives Dan a knife, and says, "It is yours", instructing Dan to take it and say, "Yours and mine".

Between Darkovan men, each of whom has a knife, the ritual words are said by both of them in turn as they trade knives. Several times in the books, men exchange knives and from that day forward are bredin, notably Regis Hastur and Danilo Syrtis in The Heritage of Hastur and Jeff Kerwin and Rannirl in The Bloody Sun. Renunciates also follow this custom.

Dress
In The Spell Sword, Andrew Carr arrives at Armida in clothes that are simply no good any more, as Damon Ridenow says. Carr has survived a plane crash and a blizzard with the help of Callista Leynier. Damon obtains the loan of "the hall-steward's holiday suit" for Andrew, which is:
"...a shirt and knee-length under-drawers of coarse linen; over which went suedelike breeches, flared somewhat from knee to ankle; a long-sleeved finely embroidered shirt with wide sleeves gathered in at the wrist; and a leather jerkin. There were knitted stockings that tied at the knee, and over them low felt boots lined with fur". 
That outfit is indoor wear. Outdoor wear is described in The Winds of Darkover, when Dan Barron travels on horseback with three Darkovan men:
All three wore loose heavy breeches, falling in flaps over high, carefully-fitted boots, and laced tunic-like shirts in rich, dark colors. Gwynn and Colryn had thick, fur-lined riding-cloaks, and Lerrys a short loose fur jacket with a hood. All three wore short gauntlets, knives in their belts and smaller knives in pockets at the top of their boots; Gwynn had a sword as well, although for riding it was swung across the crupper of his horse. They all had hair cut smoothly below their ears and a variety of amulets and jewelry.

Men generally carry a sword if they can afford one, which is a weapon that complies with the Compact. Comyn families, unless extremely poor, can afford swords, and the male children are trained in sword-play from a young age. Whether they carry a sword or not, men usually carry a knife or two, as described above.

In The Shattered Chain, Chapter 6, there is a detailed description of the dress of women. Writing of Magdalene Lorne, Bradley says:
She wore the ordinary dress of a woman of Thendara: a long, full skirt of heavy cloth, woven in a tartan pattern, a high-necked and long-sleeved tunic, embroidered at the neck, and ankle-high sandals of thin leather. Her hair was long and dark, coiled low on her neck and fastened with the butterfly-shaped clasp that every woman wore in the Domains. Magda's was made of silver, a noblewoman would have worn copper, a poor woman's clasp would have been carved of wood or even leather; but no chaste woman exposed her bare neck in public.
After hanging the clothes up, Magda rubs "their folds with an aromatic mix of spices; it was as important to smell right as to look right". Magda wears a riding-cloak when she undertakes a journey into the Hellers.

Renunciates who provide bodyguard services or lead expeditions generally wear a long knife, which by law and custom (established by Varzil the Good, who gave the Renunciates their charter) is not as long as a sword. Renunciates who are midwives or prepare food, etc. generally do not carry a weapon. Camilla n'ha Kyria is an exception. Before she became a Renunciate she posed as a man and lived as a mercenary, and she still wears a sword.

Comyn women carry a small dagger for personal protection, or perhaps to use on themselves if they are captured and in danger of rape or some other humiliation ([[The Shattered Chain]], Chapter 2).

Relations between the sexes
The Shattered Chain has much information about sexual mores, traditions and prohibitions on Darkover. Also, repeatedly throughout the series, women's thoughts (seldom expressed aloud) are concerned with being "brood mares"; e. g. "I was of no value; the daughters I bore him at risk of my life were of no value; I was nothing but an instrument to give him sons" (Kindra, speaking in The Shattered Chain, Chapter 2). In Darkover Landfall, it is made clear to the colonists by the ship's officers that for the colony to survive, the women must bear as many children as possible, with as many male partners as possible for genetic diversity. This led to women having an inferior social position to men.

In Comyn society, a formal marriage is di catenas (evidently derived from Spanish "de cadenas", meaning "of chains"). In the ceremony, the married couple submit to locked wrist bracelets that are connected with a chain. Later the chain is removed but the symbolic wrist bracelets traditionally remain. In the Dry Towns, a woman remains chained all her life, but to herself. The "bracelets were connected with a long chain, passed through a metal loop on her belt, so that if the woman moved either hand, the other was drawn up tight against the loop on her waist" (The Shattered Chain, Chapter 1).

A less formal marriage is called "a marriage of freemates". This is the typical form of marriage for lower classes, although the Comyn enter into freemate marriages as well. There may or may not be a ceremony of some kind, such as a feast. Renunciates are forbidden by their oath to enter into any other kind of marriage. This sort of marriage can be ended by mutual agreement, although it is not uncommon for it to last for the lives of the partners. In the Hellers, a freemate marriage may be established by mutual agreement and the sharing of "a bed, a meal, and a fireside". Lew Alton and Marjorie Scott observe this tradition in The Heritage of Hastur.

The culture of the Comyn tolerates homosexuality in men and women to some extent. The chieri, from whom the Comyn are descended, change from male to female, or vice versa, when it is appropriate to the individual. Some of the Comyn are permanently neither male nor female in a physical sense. In Sharra's Exile, Chapter 9, after Lew Alton meets his young daughter Marguerida, he learns from Rafael Scott that Thyra, Marguerida's mother:

was ... like the chieri. Emmasca; no one was really sure if she was boy or girl. I can remember her like that, when I was very small, but only a little. Then Kadarin came -- and very soon after, she began to wear women's clothing and think of herself as a woman... that was when we began to call her Thyra... before that, she had another name.

The sex-changing chieri drive the plot of The World Wreckers to its conclusion. Bradley needed to deal with the issue of homosexuality to write the book. Bradley claimed that she was the first science fiction author to do this.

Among commoners, male homosexuals are called embredin (evidently derived from bredin) or "sandal-wearers" (chaireth) to mock them or equate them with women.

Female homosexuality is sometimes believed, even by Comyn, to be a characteristic of the Renunciates. In The Shattered Chain, Chapter 5, Lady Jerana Hastur says:
"...I have always heard that the Free Amazons are eager to find pretty young girls whom they can convert to their unnatural way of life, turning them against marriage and motherhood, making them haters of men and lovers of women".

This may be an example of Bradley's ironic social commentary. Everyone except Jerana Hastur is offended by this speech.

Various customs and music
Darkovans celebrate midsummer and midwinter with gift-giving, feasting and dancing. As noted above, Darkover's weather has extremes. At Midwinter, travel may be impossible, but at Midsummer, there may be days without snow or rain when it is possible for people to gather together and have a celebration.

A typical midsummer gift from a man to a woman is a basket of fruit and flowers, left anonymously at her door. A midwinter gift, when fruit and flowers are unavailable, may be candy and preserved food. Women sometimes leave gifts for men (especially spouses), and Renunciates give seasonal gifts to one another. Members of a family exchange gifts.

At Comyn Castle in Thendara, there is an elaborate celebration on both holidays with tables of food and drink. There is organized social dancing: ring-dances, traditional dances by soloists, and dances with chosen partners.

Music
The ryll is mentioned many times. It is described as a small harp. It is apparently considered one of the few instruments, maybe the only one, that is suitable for women to play. There are larger harps, a sort of viol, and some wind instruments, but there are no mentions of women playing them.

In Exile's Song, Chapter 3, Marguerida Alton is shown a ryll that (it is later revealed) belonged to her mother, Thyra. This ryll is played with "levers". Music-master Everard can only get a single chord from it, though, and says that none of his students have been able to play it. Marguerida is able to play it and she sings the ballad "The Outlaw", which Master Everard knows. Marguerida does not know where she learned the song and says that the harp is haunted.

In the same chapter, Marguerida and her teacher observe that the sound holes of stringed Darkovan instruments are star-shaped (later called a "many-pointed star"), and Master Everard is interested to learn that Terrans make them in another shape.

The drone-pipe is apparently similar to the bagpipe, and was used during battles to create a loud noise and frighten the enemy. At the time of Exile's Song no one on Earth ("Terra") knows how to play one, but there are still players on Darkover.

Master Everard's collection of instruments also includes "fiols" of different sizes, apparently similar to a violin or viola, on which Marguerida plays some Bach and Mozart. He also has a collection of wooden flutes of some kind, and some horns made of metal, which are Terran products. Darkover is poor in metals, and constructing a metal musical instrument would be folly (Exile's Song, Chapter 3).

In The Forbidden Tower, Chapter 7, Dom Esteban asks for some music after dinner, and his daughter Callista sings at Andrew Carr's request. She takes up a small harp (not stated to be a rryl) and begins:

How came this blood on your right handBrother, tell me, tell me

... which draws immediate protests from her twin sister Ellemir and Dezi (Desiderio Leynier). Dezi believes himself to be Esteban's son, not without reason, and it is considered very bad luck, or a deadly insult, for a woman to sing that song in her brother's hearing. Esteban ruthlessly says that no son of his is present and orders Callista to continue.

We sat at feast, we fought in jest,
    Sister, I vow to thee,
A berserk's rage came in my hand
And I slew them shamefully.

The song is a version of an ancient ballad, known by several names, including "Edward".

Dancing
"Only men laugh, only men dance, only men weep". - Lew Alton in Sharra's Exile. Evidently this is a proverbial expression.

Dancing is an important part of Darkovan culture.

In The Heritage of Hastur, Dyan Ardais performs a solo "sword dance" at the Midwinter Ball in Comyn Castle.

In The World Wreckers, the chieri Keral, to celebrate her (formerly his) new love for David Hamilton, begins an ecstatic dance that draws in all the Telepathic Council; the result is that the plots of the World Wreckers are exposed, a person with telekinetic powers explodes a bomb that is intended to destroy the telepathic Darkovans at the cost of his life, and Andrea Closson, another chieri and one of the World Wreckers, vows to repair the damage she has done.

Religious traditions of Darkover
On the whole, the inhabitants of Darkover are not particularly religious and do not celebrate any obvious religious rituals. However, all the castles of the Domains, and Comyn Castle as well, have a "chapel" that has seating and murals (or statues) of the gods and goddesses. Also present are murals depicting scenes from "The Ballad of Hastur and Cassilda". Formal marriages (di catenas) may be conducted in the chapel, or a person may retreat to it for solitude and meditation.

Darkovans believe in four deities: Avarra (goddess of birth and death), Evanda (goddess of life and warmth, and hence marriage), Aldones (lord of light), and Zandru (lord of the nine hells). Each of Zandru's hells is colder than the one above it, because Darkovans, living on a freezing planet, conceive of a cold hell. Hastur, the mythological progenitor of the Comyn, is supposedly the son of Aldones. In Thendara House and City of Sorcery Magdalen Lorne hears the "calling of crows", a sign that Avarra is present.

These entities are believed to have power in the world, but no particular interest in individual persons. However, at least one of them canonically exists: in The Shadow Matrix, Evanda is physically present, tends the fire and prepares food at the marriage of Mikhail and Marguerida. In Sharra's Exile, when Regis Hastur is fighting Sharra using the Sword of Aldones, a "damnable" face appears in the sky, presumably Aldones himself.

The Forge-Folk worship the "form of fire", known as Sharra, who appears as a fiery, chained, red-haired female figure, a manifestation of the Sharra matrix, or perhaps a being from another dimension. Bradley offers multiple conflicting explanations for Darkover's native deities, perhaps deliberately leaving the answers open to interpretation.

Some Darkovans also follow a Terran-originated belief system. These are the Cristoforos, whose beliefs derive from the work of a Catholic monk, Father Valentine, who accompanied the original expedition. Cristoforo is a corruption of St. Christopher of Centaurus, and the central figure of the belief system is the Bearer of Burdens.

These two belief systems operate side by side. A Darkovan may believe in one or the other, or frequently both, without difficulty.

Plants

Kireseth
Kireseth is a plant that produces blue bell-like flowers which when covered with pollen appear to be golden. The plants bloom when very warm weather lasts for more than a day or two, a rare weather event on Darkover. The kireseth flowers release large amounts of hallucinatory pollen, creating what is called a "ghost wind." Humans and animals that inhale the pollen exhibit strange behavior, sexual activity, and violence.

The original colonists had no knowledge of this plant or its effects. The first known ghost wind resulted in a human woman becoming impregnated by a chieri, an orgy, and a massacre. Later, the Darkovans learned to distill substances from parts of the kireseth plant to either enhance telepathic ability or inhibit it.

Kireseth is important in the mythology of Darkover; the Blessed Cassilda, ancestor of the Comyn, is depicted in paintings as holding a bouquet of flowering kireseth. In The Forbidden Tower, Damon Ridenow and his circle fit together the mythological pieces and prove to themselves that a female Keeper need not be a virgin, or even chaste, to act as the center of a telepathic circle, if she uses kireseth. They are seen as rebels, and have to fight a telepathic battle to keep their circle and the "forbidden" tower they have created in the overworld. Their use of kireseth is viewed as blasphemy by many (ironically, since this use is portrayed in religious art) and when Damon's daughter, Cleindori (Dorilys Aillard) attempts to use this knowledge as the Keeper of Arilinn, a legitimate tower, she and her followers are hunted and killed. Cleindori means "Golden Bell" and is a nickname connoting her blonde hair with the appearance of the kireseth flower.

Resin Tree
The resin tree is found on the slopes of all the mountains surrounding the inhabited parts of Darkover and down into the lowlands. It is apparently a kind of evergreen conifer that forms thick forests. Dry weather and summer storms with lightning create a great danger of these forests catching on fire, which the Darkovans combat in various ways. Small fires are fought by fire crews; no one is exempt from fire duty. Large fires may need to be put out by telepathic weather-workers who create a rainstorm.

Spicebush
A "spiky" weed that grows in the desert near the Dry-towns, where nothing else grows. However, in The Shattered Chain, Chapter 3, it is described as "fluffy".

Rhowyn
A tree with a six-petaled flower (Traitor's Sun, chapter 18). It is used as a nickname for the six-membered cells of the Sons of Darkover, a somewhat subversive organization. The name sounds like Rowan but the flower is different.

Fiberpods
This plant produces "pods" that after they are soaked in water can be unraveled to produce a useful fiber. There may be several kinds of plants that do this to protect their seeds from the elements. As some colonists discovered in Darkover Landfall, the chieri spin these fibers and create cloth from them using a loom. Andrea Closson, in The World Wreckers, upon finding a partly unraveled pod, starts to make thread out of it, out of habit.

The Trailmen build their cities from this fiber by stringing it between the trees like a suspension bridge and weaving a floor.

Herbs and vegetables
It is clear from Darkover Landfall that some food plants were brought to Darkover by the colonists. Whether the ones mentioned in the chronologically later books are the same is not clear. Of course, the original stock may have been subject to selection to adapt to a redder sun and colder temperatures. Also, it appears from several of the books that the castles and great houses of the Comyn have greenhouses for the growing of vegetables and herbs. In The Forbidden Tower, Chapter 7, Damon Ridenow says that plants on Darkover have adapted by evolution to flower in winter, if there are a couple of warm days. He says that "ice-melons" cannot be grown on the plains of Armida: "It's too warm -- they're a plant of the glaciers".

However, apples grow in Armida. Damon and Andrew, after eating lunch, plant their apple cores in the ground and Andrew says: "Some day, Damon. our children will eat apples from these trees" (The Forbidden Tower, Chapter 7).

Snap-beans are mentioned in Traitor's Sun, chapter 17, when Domenic volunteers to help in the kitchen of an inn, and he is shown how to "string" them. He is told the cook "fries them with bacon" implying that there are pigs on Darkover.

Sleepweed: supposedly able to put a person into a sleep for ten days, although this may be an exaggeration (Traitor's Sun, chapter 16).

Goldenflower: Used to make a tea that eases menstrual cramps (City of Sorcery, Chapter 12).

Blackthorn: Used to make a bitter tea that is used to treat altitude sickness (City of Sorcery, Chapter 19). Perhaps the same as black thornleaf, used in poultices to treat frostbite by "draw[ing] the blood to the limbs and back to the heart"; also given in tea for frostbite (The Forbidden Tower, Chapter 6).

Mushrooms
Raising mushrooms is common in the hills and mountains. A kind of mushroom grows naturally on dead trees; harvesting requires only a knife and a sack.

Animals
It is unclear whether domestic animals are descended from stock brought by the colonists or whether they are domesticated native species. In the alternative, the Darkovans could have obtained them from the Terran Empire after rediscovery. Chickens, cattle and sheep are all mentioned, and pigs can be inferred from bacon.

The presence of Terran-sounding animals such as butterflies and snakes (The Shattered Chain, Chapter 3) is unexplained. It is not clear if they are Darkovan analogs of Terran species.

Horse
The history of horses on Darkover is ambiguous. In Hawkmistress! (during the Ages of Chaos) there is a battle in which the opposing sides charge at each other on horseback. However, in books that are historically later, it is said that horses were unknown until Terrans brought them. The Altons became known for raising them, especially after the Terran Andrew (An'ndra) Carr married into the family (as depicted in The Spell Sword and The Forbidden Tower). By the time of Exile's Song horses are common, and there are also mules.

Butterfly
Apparently Darkover has native species of butterflies. They are mentioned both in descriptions of nature and in references to the "butterfly clasp" used by women to hold hair in a way that covers the back of the neck. For a woman to expose the back of her neck is considered indecent.

Hawks and vultures
Hawks exist and are domesticated using ancient hawking techniques, which can be enhanced by laran. In several of the books, e. g. The Bloody Sun, people go hawking, and it appears to be a form of recreation common among the Comyn. The hawk "Preciosa" domesticated by Romilly MacAran in Hawkmistress! is called a verrin hawk. Smaller hawks are said to be more suitable for ladies by a Comyn lord, who says it is "disgraceful" that Romilly is allowed to fly a verrin hawk (Hawkmistress!, Part 1, Chapter 5). It is not clear how many kinds of hawks there are.

The kyorebni is a kind of vulture. The presence of water holes in the Drylands can be inferred by kyorebni circling over them (The Shattered Chain, Chapter 4). A larger species of vulture is called a "sentry-bird" and can be used for aerial surveillance in wartime (Hawkmistress!, Parts 2and 3). The kyorebni is called a "Lammergeier" in Terran Standard (City of Sorcery, Chapter 11).

Chervine
The chervine is an animal native to Darkover. It is apparently similar to a deer in its general appearance and has horns, but it has been domesticated and is used for riding and as a pack animal. It is also used for food.

Rabbithorn
The rabbithorn is native to Darkover. It is considered to be very good eating, even a delicacy. In Traitor's Sun it is mentioned that the inn, The Crowing Cock, keeps them in cages. In Darkover Landfall the colonists discuss raising them domestically for their fur. Rabbithorn (the plural and singular are the same) may be stuffed and roasted, placed on a platter and served with mushrooms, other vegetables and a savory or sweet sauce. They are also made into a stew.

This animal is never clearly described. It may be partly a joke based on the Jackalope or the Wolpertinger.

Ice-Rabbit
The ice-rabbit lives in the mountains and is an important prey of banshees. The ice-rabbit population increases and decreases according to the availability of food. When there are plenty of ice-rabbits, the banshees stay above the snow-line, but when the ice-rabbit population crashes, the banshees start to hunt lower down and are a greater danger to travelers (City of Sorcery, Chapter 19).

Scorpion Ant
The scorpion ant is an insect-like organism with pincers and a potentially deadly sting that lives in colonies. In Darkover Landfall a member of an expedition steps on a nest and arouses the inhabitants, leading to his painful and sudden death.

Banshee
The banshee is a large, flightless, blind, bird-like predator that lives in the mountains, commonly above the line of permanent snow. It apparently hunts by seeking warmth, and it will attack any warm-blooded animal. It catches its prey by screaming to paralyze it and then disemboweling it with a stroke of one of its clawed feet or by a bite of its huge beak. It is mentioned in nearly all the novels, and a few characters hear its scream, or actually see the banshee and have a narrow escape.

There are several speculations about the banshee's paralyzing scream in various books. The scream may be so terrifying that its prey is afraid to move. Alternatively, it has been suggested that banshees have a laran that can take over the mind of another and leave him vulnerable.

Dragon
The dragon is an extinct, perhaps mythical creature on Darkover. Marion Zimmer Bradley, in the introduction to "Coils" by Patricia Shaw Mathews in the anthology Red Sun of Darkover, says that she has "always thought of Darkover as a place of which one might say, 'Here there be dragons'". There are two canonical references to the dragon: The "Ballad of the Death of the Last Dragon" as described in Two To Conquer, and the proverb, "It is wrong (or "ill done") to keep a dragon chained to roast your meat". Various characters speculate on the meaning of this saying:
 It would be dangerous to make a dragon work for you. 
 Something powerful and dangerous should not be used for a trivial purpose.
 It would be right to keep a dragon chained to render him harmless, but a dragon has no use.
 Dragons cannot be chained, at least not for very long.
 Dragons do not exist, and the saying is humorous.

Notes

References

External links

 Mapping Darkover - an essay about Darkover's geography
 Darkover on TV Tropes

 
Fictional terrestrial planets
 

es:Saga de Darkover